George Lamar Beck Jr. (born September 11, 1941) is an American attorney who served as the United States Attorney for the Middle District of Alabama from 2011 to 2017. In March 2017, he joined the law firm of Morris, Haynes, Hornsby, Wheeles & Knowles.

Education
Beck graduated from Auburn University with a Bachelor of Arts degree in 1963 and from the University of Alabama School of Law with a Bachelor of Laws degree in 1966.

Legal career
He has been a shareholder of Capell & Howard, P.C. since 2004. He was a sole practitioner from 1986 to 2003 and from 1979 to 1982 and was a partner at Baxley, Beck, Dillard & Dauphin from 1982 to 1986. He worked as an associate at St. John & St. John from 1966 to 1971. After resigning as U.S. Attorney, he joined the law firm of Morris, Haynes, Hornsby, Wheeles & Knowles which is based in Birmingham and Alexander City.

Government & Military service
Beck served as the Deputy Attorney General of Alabama from 1971 to 1979. He enlisted in the Alabama Army National Guard in 1966 and retired as a colonel in 2001.

United States Attorney
Beck was nominated by President Barack Obama to be United States Attorney for the Middle District of Alabama on March 31, 2011. On June 30, 2011, he was confirmed by the Senate by voice vote. On July 6, 2011, he was sworn in as United States Attorney. He resigned on March 10, 2017, after being order to by President Donald Trump as part of the 2017 dismissal of U.S. attorneys.

See also
2017 dismissal of U.S. attorneys

References

1941 births
Living people
United States Attorneys for the Middle District of Alabama
Alabama Democrats
People from Geneva County, Alabama